Retox is an American rock band that formed in 2011. The four-piece was founded by Justin Pearson and Gabe Serbian, both of whom had previously performed together in The Locust, Holy Molar and Head Wound City. The two additional members are Thor Dickey and Michael Crain. Serbian was replaced by Brian Evans in 2013. Retox has since been signed to Ipecac Recordings and Epitaph Records and released three studio albums: Ugly Animals (2011), YPLL (2013) and Beneath California (2015).

History

Formation and Ugly Animals (2011) 
Retox formed in 2011, originally out of founding members Justin Pearson's and Gabe Serbian's disappointment that their previous band Head Wound City was too short-lived and wanted to rehash that sound, though this sound evolved over time and with the addition of Thor Dickey and Michael Crain. The band released a self-titled EP and their debut album Ugly Animals that year through Ipecac Recordings, a California-based record label co-founded by Mike Patton and Greg Werckman. Ugly Animals was self-funded by the band members and recorded on analog tape to capture the aesthetic of the band that could not be captured digitally, a decision made by engineer Manny Nieto.

YPLL (2012–2013) 
In 2013, Retox announced that they signed to Brett Gurewitz's Epitaph Records for their second studio album. Pearson previously worked with Epitaph to release two releases from The Locust and Heaven's Pregnant Teens in 2006 from his former band Some Girls. Retox released YPLL through the label on May 7, 2013. Prior to the release of the album, founding drummer Serbian left and was replaced by Brian Evans. For YPLL, Retox focused more on simpler song structures and guitar riffs, and featured a guest appearance from Nick Zinner on the track "Congratulations, You Are Good Enough".

Beneath California (2014–present) 
The band closed out 2014 with a split EP with Narrows. The EP was released through Pearson's own Three One G label and featured two tracks: the exclusive song "Fascination Street" and "This Should Hurt a Little Bit", which would appear on the band's following studio album. Retox released its third studio album titled Beneath California on February 10, 2015, again through Epitaph. In support of Beneath California, Retox toured North America February–March 2015 with Whores.

Members

Current
 Justin Pearson – vocals (2011–present)
 Michael Crain – guitar (2011–present)
 Ryan Bergmann – bass (2015–present)
 Kevin Avery - drums (2017–present)

Former
 Gabe Serbian – drums (2011, died 2022)
 Brian Evans – drums (2011–2016)
 Thor Dickey – bass (2011–?)
 Keith Hendriksen – bass (?–2015)

Discography

Studio albums

EPs and splits

Music videos
 "A Bastard on Father's Day" (2011)
 "Biological Process of Politics" (2013)
 "Let's Not Keep in Touch" (2015)
 "Without Money, We'd All Be Rich" (2015)
 "Die in Your Own Cathedral" (2015)

References

External links 
 
 Retox discography at Rate Your Music
 Retox discography at Discogs

Musical groups established in 2011
Epitaph Records artists
Hardcore punk groups from California
Ipecac Recordings artists
2011 establishments in California